The Mayor Gallery is an art gallery located in Cork Street, London, England. Since its foundation by Fred Mayor in partnership with Douglas Cooper in 1925, it has promoted modern and contemporary art. Since the early 1970s, under the new impulse given by James Mayor, Fred Mayor's son, the Gallery started to focus actively on the work of contemporary American artists from the Pop art movement but also Conceptual art and Abstract expressionism such as Eva Hesse, Roy Lichtenstein, Agnes Martin, Claes Oldenburg, Robert Rauschenberg, Robert Ryman, Cy Twombly and Andy Warhol. More recently, taking further its interest for Minimal art and Dada, the Gallery has been promoting artists of the international Zero (art) movement, including Heinz Mack, Otto Piene amongst others.

History
The Mayor Gallery opened in 1925 at 37 Sackville Street. The gallery closed in 1926, and reopened in 1933 at 18 Cork Street, in an area regarded as the historic art district of London. Many foreign artists were exhibited for the very first time in England at the Mayor Gallery including major ones such as  Alexander Calder and Paul Klee. In its early years the Mayor Gallery was also instrumental to the creation of Unit One, a British group formed by the painter Paul Nash in 1933 with fellow artists Henry Moore, Ben Nicholson, Barbara Hepworth, Edward Wadsworth, Edward Burra and others to promote Modern art, architecture and design.

Notes

External links
 

Contemporary art galleries in London
Art galleries established in 1925